Blue Pond, also spelled Bluepond, is an unincorporated community in Cherokee County, Alabama, United States.

History
A post office called Blue Pond was established in 1850, and remained in operation until it was discontinued in 1907. The community took the name of a neighboring pond.

References

Unincorporated communities in Cherokee County, Alabama
Unincorporated communities in Alabama
Populated coastal places in Alabama